The Sony Xperia T3 is an Android smartphone developed by Sony Mobile Communications. It was announced in June 2014 and was released in July 2014.

Specifications

Hardware 
The Sony Xperia T3 has a 5.3-inch IPS LCD display, Quad-core 1.4 GHz Cortex-A7 Qualcomm Snapdragon 400 processor, 1 GB of RAM and 8 GB of internal storage that can be expanded using microSD cards up to 32 GB. The phone has a 2500 mAh Li-Ion battery, 8 MP rear camera with LED flash and 1.1 MP front-facing camera. It is available in Black, White, Purple colors.

Software 
The Xperia T3 was initially shipped with Android 4.4.2 (KitKat) with Sony's custom launcher on top. Some notable additions to the software include Sony's Media applications – Walkman, Album and Videos. NFC is also a core feature of the device, allowing 'one touch' to mirror what is on the smartphone to compatible TVs or play music on a NFC wireless speaker. Additionally, the device includes a battery stamina mode which increases the phone's standby time up to 4 times. Several Google applications (such as Google Chrome, Google Play, Google search (with voice), Google Maps and Google Talk) already come preloaded.

On 13 August 2014, the Xperia T3 got a minor bug-fixing update which moved the version number from 18.2.A.1.14 to 18.2.A.1.18 on the HSPA+ variant (D5102) and from 18.1.A.1.17 to 18.1.A.1.21 on the LTE variant (D5103, D5106).

On 8 January 2015, the Xperia T3 got an update which moved the Android version to 4.4.4 (KitKat). The version number is 18.1.A.2.32 for the HSPA+ variant and 18.1.A.2.25 for the LTE variant, respectively.

There won't be an update to Android 5.0 Lollipop.

References 

T3
Android (operating system) devices
Discontinued smartphones